Mother Hospital is a multi-speciality hospital situated in Olari; near Thrissur, Kerala state, India. For more than two decades, Mother Hospital has developed unmatched trust with its patients on the basis of a strong foundation which includes best medical expertise and fast medical attention to critical patients. We are extremely proud that today, we serve patients from all walks of life and not only national but also international with multispecialty and super-specialty medical support through our well qualified and experienced team of doctors and supporting staff.. Our approach have always been with a human touch; which truly reflects the essence of our motto “a mothers touch to healthcare”. We have the best neonatal care center that is one of its kinds in the city.

The hospital was founded in 1991 by Dr. Ali and Dr. Aysha Ali, with 15 doctors, 7 departments, 70 paramedical personnel and 100 beds. The hospitals 65 doctors, 30 departments and over 400 staff members with 300 beds and have facilities in Cardiology, Neurology, Urology, Nephrology, Gastroenterology, Gynaecology, Rheumatology, Paediatric surgery & Neonatology services.

References

Hospital buildings completed in 1991
Hospitals in Thrissur
1991 establishments in Kerala

20th-century architecture in India